Lynn Anderson is a compilation album by American country artist Lynn Anderson. It was released in October 1971 via Chart Records and was produced by Slim Williamson. It was the sixth compilation released in Anderson's career and her final release for the Chart label. The album was a double record that contained 24 songs in total.

Background, release and reception
Lynn Anderson a double-album compilation released following her departure from the Chart record company. Anderson had left the label in 1970 to record for the larger Columbia Records. Since her departure, Chart released several compilations of her earlier work. This eponymous compilation was her last with Chart to be released in the United States. All of the material was produced by Slim Williamson. All songs had first been released on earlier albums. A total of 24 tracks were included on this double set album. Included were some of her biggest Chart hits, such as "If I Kiss You (Will You Go Away)" and "Big Girls Don't Cry." Also included was several cover versions of hits first recorded by other artists, such as Johnny Cash's "Ring of Fire" and Merle Haggard's "(My Friends Are Gonna Be) Strangers."

The eponymous album was released in October 1971 via Chart Records, becoming her sixth compilation release in her career. The album was issued as a vinyl LP, containing two records. Each record contained a total of 12 songs, with six songs on each side. Like her previous Chart compilation, the record did not reach any chart positions on Billboard upon its release. This included the Top Country Albums chart. The album did receive positive reception in later years from Allmusic. The publication gave it 4.5 out of 5 possible stars.

Track listing

Record one

Record two

Personnel
All credits are adapted from the liner notes of Lynn Anderson.

Musical and technical personnel
 Lynn Anderson – lead vocals
 Slim Williamson – producer

Release history

References

1971 albums
Albums produced by Slim Williamson
Chart Records albums
Lynn Anderson compilation albums